NFCT can refer to

 National Festival of Community Theatre
 New Israeli Foundation For Cinema & TV
 Non-federal control tower
 Northern Forest Canoe Trail
 North Fork Community Theatre, a community theatre on the North Fork of Long Island